Tylisos (also Pyrgos-Tylissos or Tylissos; ; Linear B: Tu-li-so) is a town and a former municipality in the Heraklion regional unit, Crete, Greece. Since the 2011 local government reform it is part of the municipality Malevizi, of which it is a municipal unit. Population 2,867 in 2011. It is an ancient Minoan peak sanctuary and town. The Municipality of Tylisos was created in 1999 and includes 11 villages. The economy is based on agriculture, mainly grape cultivation (accounting for 4.8% of the island’s production) and olive cultivation. At the same time stock farming of sheep, goats and chickens and beehive farms are abundant.

Archaeology

Tylisos was excavated 1909–1913 by Joseph Hadzidakis, 1953–1955 by Nicholas Platon and in 1971 by A. Kanta. The town was in use Early Minoan II to Late Minoan IIIA, and the peak sanctuary, excavated in 1963 by Alexiou, was in use until at least Late Minoan IA. Structures include houses, a cistern and an aqueduct with clay pipes. Excavation finds have included a pithos with Linear A inscriptions, stone horns, and clay human and animal figurines.

There are also a significant number of caves including the Kamilari Cave, Hainospilios Cave, Trapeza Cave, Doxa and Arkaliospilio. There are also two gorges which are namely: the Almiros gorge, the Gonies gorge. 
Agrotourism is also a very popular among visitors all year round. Arolithos village, Ktima Kares and Agrotikon are the most visited sites for this and other leisure activities.

Also nearby is Sklavokampos.

References

Sources
 Jones, Donald W. 1999 Peak Sanctuaries and Sacred Caves of Minoan Crete 
 Kyriakidis, Evangelos, 2005, Ritual in the Aegean: The Minoan Peak Sanctuaries, London: Duckworth publishers
 Kyriakidis, Evangelos 2007, ‘Finding Ritual: Calibrating the Evidence’, in Kyriakidis, E. (ed.), 2007.  The Archaeology of Ritual, Los Angeles: Cotsen Institute of Archaeology UCLA publications, pp. 9–22

External links
Minoan Crete, Tylissos page

Peak sanctuaries
Populated places in ancient Greece
Cretan city-states
Populated places in Heraklion (regional unit)